Pathimoonam Number Veedu, also known as 13am Number Veedu, is a 1990 Tamil-language horror film directed by Baby. The film stars Nizhalgal Ravi, Sadhana and Lalitha Kumari. It was released on 15 June 1990 and became a success. The film was remade in Hindi as House No. 13 (1991) directed by Baby.

Plot

Selvam (Nizhalgal Ravi), an estate manager, and his family move into a new house based in a remote village. There, Selvam falls in love with Annam (Sadhana), a jolly village girl. Disturbed by a ghost (Lalitha Kumari), Selvam's grandfather dies from a heart attack. One day, Murali (Jaishankar), Selvam's brother, goes to an isolated home and treats an old lady. The next day, he realizes that the old lady was a ghost and he also dies from a heart attack. The family, in mourning, decides to arrange Selvam's wedding with Annam to forget this tragedy. Thereafter, Annam becomes pregnant but even after 10 months, she doesn't deliver. A Gurukkal (Ra. Sankaran) comes to the aid of the family and he feels that something has stopped her delivery. He prepares a ritual and the ghost finally appears and tells him about her past.

The ghost was the young woman named Rekha. She lived happily with her husband (Ravikanth) but her husband had a lot of bad habits and also had a lot of debts. Under pressures, he forced his wife Rekha to have a sexual relationship with the house owner. She refused and killed the house owner. Afterwards, her angry husband killed her in turn. She then became a ghost and killed her husband. Since that day, she killed every male who stayed in the house.

Cast

Nizhalgal Ravi as Selvam
Sadhana as Annam
Lalitha Kumari as Rekha / Ghost
Jaishankar as Murali
Sripriya as Murali's wife
Ravikanth as Rekha's husband
Nalinikanth
Achamillai Gopi as Muthu
Ra. Sankaran as Swamy
S. N. Parvathiy as Parvathi, Selvam and Murali's mother
Baby Manju as Manju

Soundtrack

The film score and the soundtrack were composed by Sangeetha Rajan. The soundtrack, released in 1990, features 3 tracks with lyrics written by Pulaimaipithan.

References

1990 films
1990 horror films
Indian horror films
Tamil films remade in other languages
1990s Tamil-language films
Films directed by Baby (director)